Fencing at the 2014 Asian Games was held in Goyang Gymnasium, Goyang, South Korea from September 20 to 25, 2014.

Schedule

Medalists

Men

Women

Medal table

Participating nations
A total of 238 athletes from 25 nations competed in fencing at the 2014 Asian Games:

References

External links
 Schedule and results

 
2014
2014 Asian Games events
Asian Games
2014 Asian Games